Sereine Mauborgne (born 3 May 1972) is a French politician of La République En Marche! (LREM) who has been a member of the French National Assembly since the 2017 elections, representing Var's 4th constituency in the department of Var.

In parliament, Mauborgne serves on the Defence Committee. In addition to her committee assignments, she chairs the French delegation to the Parliamentary Assembly of the Organization for Security and Co-operation in Europe (OSCE PA). She is also a member of the French parliamentary friendship groups with Central Asia, Cyprus, Iraq and Mauritius.

See also
 2017 French legislative election

References

1972 births
Living people
Deputies of the 15th National Assembly of the French Fifth Republic
People from Le Mans
La République En Marche! politicians
21st-century French women politicians
Place of birth missing (living people)
Women members of the National Assembly (France)